Intel Array Visualizer version 3.1 - is a scientific graphics software.

The software can read the data in a variety of formats, including scientific formats such as FITS and netCDF. It can produce x-y plots, contour plots, and create image plots. One can save plots in a variety of formats.

External links
http://software.intel.com/en-us/articles/intel-array-visualizer

Plotting software
Earth sciences graphics software
Array Visualizer